Orca is another name for a killer whale, the world's biggest dolphin species.

Orca, ORCA or Orcas may also refer to:

People
 Quintus Valerius Orca (fl. 50s–40s B.C.), Roman praetor and officer under Julius Caesar

Places
 Orca Basin, a mini-basin in the northern Gulf of Mexico
 Orca Bay (Alaska), a bay near the town of Cordova
 Orca (carbon capture plant), facility that uses direct air capture to remove carbon dioxide from the atmosphere
 Orca gas field, a North Sea gas field
 Orca Inlet, serves as an inlet to Prince William Sound from the Gulf of Alaska
 Orcas Island, the largest of the San Juan Islands in Washington state
 Orcas Island Airport, the correspondent airport of the island
 Orcas Village, Washington (sometimes just called Orcas), a community on the island
 Sandford Orcas, a village and parish in north west Dorset, England

Arts and entertainment

Fictional characters and vehicles
 Orca (DC Comics), the name of two different comic book characters
 Orca (.hack), a character in the .hack video game series
 Orca, a fictional fishing vessel in the 1975 film Jaws

Film
 Orca (1977 film), a horror film
 Orca (2020 film), a Swedish drama film

Literature
 Orca (novel), a 1996 fantasy novel by Steven Brust

Music
 Orcas (duo), a Pacific Northwest duo
 Orca (C-Bo album), 2012
 Orca Symphony No. 1, an album by Serj Tankian
 "Orca", a song by Deadmau5, from his 2009 compilation album At Play Vol. 2
 Orca, an album by Gus Dapperton

Organizations
 Opinion Research Center of Afghanistan
 Orca Air, a 1996–2003 Egyptian regional airline
 Orca Airways, a 2005–2018 small scheduled and charter airline based in Vancouver, British Columbia, Canada
 Orca Engineering, a Swiss sports car manufacturing company
 Orca (company), a New Zealand wetsuit and sports apparel manufacturer
 Organization for Respect and Care for Animals, an animal welfare organization
 Otonabee Region Conservation Authority, a conservation authority in Ontario, Canada

Technology and computing
The Online Representations and Certifications Application website, now superseded by the US government's System for Award Management   
 Orca, a Windows Installer database editor
 Orca (assistive technology), part of the free and open source GNOME desktop environment
 ORCA (quantum chemistry program)
 Orcas, the codename for Visual Studio 2008
 Oscillation Research with Cosmics in the Abyss, part of the KM3NeT neutrino telescope
 ORCA (computer system), a "get out the vote" application created by Mitt Romney's 2012 U.S. presidential campaign

Transportation
 Orca (supercar), a Swiss supercar
 ORCA card, a smart card for public transit in the central Puget Sound region of Washington State, USA
 Orca-class patrol vessel, a class of training vessels for the Canadian Navy
 USS Orca, several United States Navy ships
 Orca (AUV), autonomous underwater vehicle under development by Boeing and Huntington Ingalls Industries

Other
 Orca (dog) (2001–2014), a golden retriever and winner of the PDSA Gold Medal
 Omni Role Combat Aircraft (ORCA), an Indian aircraft development program
ORCA, a 3D printed AR-15 style rifle

See also
 
 Orka (comics), a villain in the Marvel comic books
 Orc
 Aukus, a trilateral security pact